Results of India national football team from 1970–1979.

1970

1971

1973

1974

1976

1977

1978

See also
India national football team results (1960–1969)
India national football team results (1980–1989)
History of the India national football team

References

1970s in Indian sport
1970